Saviour is the debut album by the UK band, Antimatter, released in 2001.

Track listing

Credits
Duncan Patterson - bass guitar, acoustic guitar, electric guitar, keyboards, programming
Mick Moss - bass guitar, acoustic guitar, electric guitar, keyboards, vocals
Michelle Richfield - guest vocals on tracks 1, 2, 3, 4, 6, 8
Hayley Windsor - guest vocals on tracks 5, 6, 7, 9
Brian Moss - sampling
Les Smith - sampling
James SK Wān – bamboo flute
Mags - lead guitar on "Going Nowhere"
Mark Kelson - artwork

References

2001 albums
The End Records albums
Antimatter (band) albums